The  was a Japanese court document issued to the daimyō of the Satsuma and Chōshū Domains in November 1867 in the build-up to the Meiji Restoration of January 1868.

Notes

References

Meiji Restoration
Tokugawa Yoshinobu family
1867 in Japan
Japanese Imperial rescripts
1867 meteorology
1867 speeches